Bernhardsthal is a town in the district of Mistelbach in the Austrian state of Lower Austria.

The municipality consists the three villages (population):

 Bernhardsthal (819)
 Katzelsdorf (370)
 Reintal (410)

Population

Notable people
 Franz Migerka (1828-1915), Museologist

Bodies of water
 Lake Bernhardsthal

References

External links

Cities and towns in Mistelbach District